Norfolkia leeuwin, known commonly as the Leeuwin triplefin, is a species of triplefin blenny in the genus Norfolkia. It was described by Ronald Fricke in 1994. This species is found in the southern part of the coast of Western Australia from the Houtmon's Abrolhos Islands to the Recherche Archipelago. It is found in rocky reefs. Its specific name references the Leeuwin Current which influences the coastal areas in which this fish occurs.

References

Leeuwin triplefin
Fish described in 1994